Pison is a cosmopolitan genus of wasps within the family Crabronidae. The genus comprises 145 described species, although many species, especially in South America remain undescribed.

Distribution
The genus is found throughout the tropical and warm temperate regions of the world, but does not extend into the more northerly temperate regions. Most species occur in the Southern Hemisphere, with a third of species occurring in Australia. This distribution pattern has been thought to indicate that the genus was once much larger, and has declined in the face of competition with more competitive wasp genera, leaving the genus largely concentrated in geographically-isolated regions.

The habit of many species of building nests in holes in wood, keyholes, and similar situations has led to a number of species being distributed widely by ships and aircraft. Several species, including P. argentatum and P. iridipenne are of uncertain native distribution, having been dispersed by humans in antiquity.

Biology
Pison wasps raise their young on a diet of living, but paralysed, spiders. Spiders are collected by adult females, paralysed by means of a sting, and an egg is laid on the spider or spiders before they are sealed into a chamber constructed by the female. The paralysed spiders do not decay, and upon hatching the wasp larva eats the spider, before pupating and emerging from the chamber as an adult.

While many species construct large mud nests in sheltered situations such as caves or tree hollows, other species make use of natural cavities such as hollow plant stems, beetle burrows, or abandoned bird nests, while still others dig their own nesting tunnels. Typically, multiple spiders-and-egg cells will be placed adjacent to one another in a larger nesting structure. Each cell is sealed off from adjoining eggs with mud or dung pellets. This sealing off of the young from each other is probably done to prevent competition and ensure that each young obtains sufficient food.

Species and other subtaxa
At one time the genus Pison was divided into the subgenera Pison, Pisonoides, Krombeiniellum, and Entomopison.  These were later discarded in favor of species groups including (for the Americas):

 Conforme
 Fritzi
 Eremnon
 Delicatum
 Agile
 Stangei
 Krombeini
 Euryops
 Cressoni
 Chilense
 Convexifrons
 Pilosum

Accepted species
The following species are accepted :

†Pison antiquum Antropov and Puławski, 1996
Pison argentatum Shuckard, 1838
Pison ashmeadi R.Turner, 1916
Pison assimile Sickmann, 1894
Pison atripenne , 1938
Pison atrum (Spinola) 1808
Pison auratum Shuckard, 1838
Pison aureosericeum Rohwer, 1915
Pison aurifex F. Smith, 1869
Pison auriventre R.Turner, 1908
Pison baguione Tsuneki, 1983
Pison barbatum Evans, 1981
Pison basale F. Smith, 1869
Pison biroi Tsuneki, 1983
Pison bismarckianum Tsuneki, 1982
Pison brasilium Menke, 1988
Pison browni (Ashmead), 1905
Pison cameronii Kohl, 1893
Pison carinatum R.Turner, 1917
Pison chilense Spinola, 1851
Pison chrysops Menke, 1988
Pison chrysoptilum Antropov, 1994
Pison ciliatum Evans, 1981
†Pison cockerellae Rohwer, 1908
Pison collare Kohl, 1884
Pison conforme F. Smith, 1869
Pison congener R.Turner, 1916
Pison cressoni Rohwer, 1911
Pison decipiens F. Smith, 1869
Pison delicatum Menke, 1988
Pison dementia Menke, 1988
Pison denticeps Cameron, 1910
Pison deperditum R.Turner, 1917
Pison differens R.Turner, 1916
Pison difficile Turner, 1908
Pison dimidiatum F. Smith, 1869
Pison dives R.Turner, 1916
Pison doggonum Menke, 1988
Pison duckei Menke, 1968
†Pison electrum Antropov and Puławski, 1989
†Pison eocenicum Nel, 2005
Pison erebus Menke, 1988
Pison eremnon Menke, 1968
Pison erimaense Tsuneki, 1983
Pison erythrocerum Kohl, 1885
Pison erythrogastrum Rohwer, 1915
Pison erythropus Kohl, 1884
Pison esakii , 1937
Pison eu Menke, 1988
Pison euryops Menke, 1988
Pison exclusum R.Turner, 1916
Pison exornatum R.Turner, 1916
Pison exultans R.Turner, 1916
Pison eyvae Menke, 1988
Pison fasciatum (Radoszkowski) 1876
Pison fenestratum F. Smith, 1869
Pison festivum F. Smith, 1869
Pison fraterculus R.Turner, 1916
Pison fritzi Menke, 1988
Pison fuscipenne F. Smith, 1869
Pison glabrum Kohl, 1908
†Pison glyptum Zhang, 1989
Pison hahadzimaense Tsuneki, 1984
Pison hissaricum , 1937
Pison hospes F. Smith, 1879
Pison huonense Tsuneki, 1983
Pison icarioides Turner, 1908
Pison ignavum R.Turner, 1908
Pison impunctatum R.Turner, 1912
Pison inaequale R.Turner, 1916
Pison inconspicuum R.Turner, 1916
Pison infumatum R.Turner, 1908
Pison insigne Sickmann, 1894
Pison insulare F. Smith, 1869
Pison iridipenne F. Smith, 1879
Pison irramulus T. Li and Q. Li, 2011
Pison Kohlii Bingham, 1897
Pison koreense (Radoszkowski) 1887
Pison korrorense , 1937
Pison krombeini Menke, 1968
Pison laeve F. Smith, 1856
Pison larsoni Menke, 1988
Pison lillo Menke, 1988
Pison liupanshanense T. Li and Q. Li, 2011
Pison lobiferum Arnold, 1945
Pison lutescens R.Turner, 1916
Pison maculipenne F. Smith, 1860
Pison maculipenne F. Smith, 1873
Pison marginatum F. Smith, 1856
Pison mariannense , 1953
Pison martini Menke, 1988
Pison melanocephalum R.Turner, 1908
†Pison menkei Bennett and Engel, 2008
Pison meridionale R.Turner, 1916
Pison mimicum Arnold, 1945
Pison morosum F. Smith, 1856
Pison multistrigatum R.Turner, 1917
Pison neotropicum Menke, 1968
Pison nigellum Krombein, 1949
Pison ningyuenfuense Antropov, 1994
Pison nitidum F. Smith, 1859
Pison noctulum R.Turner, 1908
Pison nogorombu Puławski, 1989
Pison nosferatu Menke, 1988
Pison novabritanicae Tsuneki, 1982
Pison novaguineanum Tsuneki, 1983
Pison novocaledonicum Krombein, 1949
Pison nozakae Tsuneki, 1983
Pison oakleyi Krombein, 1949
Pison obesum Arnold, 1958
Pison obliquum F. Smith, 1856
Pison obliteratum F. Smith, 1858
†Pison oligocenum Cockerell in Rohwer, 1908
Pison orientale Cameron, 1897
Pison pallidipalpe F. Smith, 1863
Pison papuanum W. Schulz, 1905
Pison pasteelsi Leclercq, 1965
Pison peletieri , 1841
Pison pentafasciatum Menke, 1988
Pison perplexum F. Smith, 1856
Pison pertinax R.Turner, 1908
Pison petularum Leclercq, 1965
Pison phthinylla Menke, 1988
Pison pistillum Menke, 1988
Pison plaumanni Menke, 1968
Pison ponape Krombein, 1949
Pison pregustum Leclercq, 1965
Pison premunitum Leclercq, 1965
Pison priscum R.Turner, 1916
Pison pulawskii Antropov, 1994
Pison pulchrinum R.Turner, 1916
Pison punctifrons Shuckard, 1838
Pison punctulatum Kohl, 1884
Pison regale F. Smith, 1852
Pison repentinum Arnold, 1940
Pison rothneyi Cameron, 1897
Pison rufipes Shuckard, 1838
Pison rufitarse Arnold, 1944
Pison rugosum F. Smith, 1856
Pison sarawakense Cameron, 1903
Pison scabrum R.Turner, 1908
Pison scruposum Arnold, 1955
Pison separatum F. Smith, 1869
Pison sericeum Kohl, 1888
Pison seyrigi Arnold, 1945
Pison simillimum F. Smith, 1869
Pison simulans R.Turner, 1915
Pison sogdianum , 1937
Pison speculare R.Turner, 1911
Pison spinolae Shuckard, 1838
Pison stangei Menke, 1968
Pison strandi , 1935
Pison strenuum R.Turner, 1916
Pison strictifrons , 1907
Pison strigulosum R.Turner, 1917
Pison susanae Cheesman, 1955
Pison sylphe Menke, 1988
Pison tahitense de Saussure, 1867
Pison tenebrosum R.Turner, 1908
Pison testaceipes R.Turner, 1916
Pison tibiale F. Smith, 1869
Pison tosawai , 1935
Pison transvaalense Cameron, 1910
Pison transversistriatum Simon Thomas, 1993
Pison trukense , 1953
Pison ugandense Arnold, 1955
Pison vechti Antropov, 1994
Pison vestitum F. Smith, 1856
Pison virosum R.Turner, 1908
Pison wagneri Arnold, 1932
Pison westwoodii Shuckard, 1838
Pison woji Menke, 1988
Pison wollastoni R.Turner, 1916
Pison xanthopus (Brullé) 1833

Pison nomina nuda
The following are not officially described and have nomen nudum status:
Pison aurifer de Saussure
Pison punctatus Ashmead

Species previously in Pison
These species have been transferred from Pison to other genera:

Entomopison alini Antropov, 1996
Pisonopsis areolatum Spinola, 1851
Entomopison aureofaciale Strand, 1910
Aulacophilinus caliginosus R.Turner, 1908
Entomopison convexifrons Taschenberg, 1870
Entomopison cooperi Menke, 1988
Scapheutes flavopictum F. Smith, 1860
Entomopison gnythos Menke, 1988
Scapheutes laetum F. Smith, 1860
Entomopison longicorne Menke, 1988
Aulacophilinus mandibulatum R.Turner, 1916
Trypoxylonvaripes nasutum Tsuneki
Entomopison oaxaca Menke, 1988
Bothynostethus paraense Spinola, 1851
Entomopison pilosum F. Smith, 1873
Aulacophilinus pyrrhicum Naumann, 1990
Trypoxylon sapporoense Tsuneki
Entomopison sphaerophallus Menke, 1988
Pisonopsis variicornis Reed, 1894
Entomopison vincenti Menke, 1988
Entomopison wasbaueri Menke, 1988
Aulacophilinus weiri Naumann, 1990

References

Crabronidae
Hymenoptera of Australia